John Marshall (24 April 1892 – 10 October 1964), nicknamed Jack or Jock, was an association football player, who represented both Scotland and the United States. His professional career took him to several clubs in Scotland, England, Wales and the United States. He earned seven caps with Scotland and one with the US national team.

Professional career
Sources disagree on the year Marshall was born. According to his Bethlehem Steel biography, he was born in 1902. Further research suggests his birth was in 1892, as his playing career started with Saltcoats Victoria in 1911. Marshall began his professional career with St Mirren, playing for the club during the First World War period, at the end of which he was part of the team that won the 1919 Victory Cup, having already claimed a medal from the minor Paisley Charity Cup four years earlier.

In November 1919, St Mirren transferred Marshall to English club Middlesbrough for £2,000. In August 1923, Marshall signed with Welsh club Llanelli. He spent only a single season with Llanelli before moving to the United States to play for the Brooklyn Wanderers of the American Soccer League (ASL). While Marshall began the 1925–1926 season with Brooklyn, he moved to the Newark Skeeters after only two games. In 1927, he again began the season with Skeeters, before returning to the Wanderers after only four games. He then moved to Bethlehem Steel in August 1928. Bethlehem then loaned him out to the Philadelphia Centennials for a few games, but he was back in Bethlehem in December. He remained with Bethlehem until the team folded in 1930.

He is also reputed to have spent time with Greenock Morton.

National team

Scotland
Between 1921 and 1924, Marshall earned seven caps with Scotland. His first cap came in a 2–1 victory over Wales on 12 February 1921. His seventh, and last, cap came almost exactly three years later in a 2–0 loss to Wales on 16 February 1924. He was captain for two matches, on 9 April 1921 and 4 February 1922.

United States
After he moved to the United States he was capped once with the United States national team on 6 November 1926; in that game, a 6–1 victory over Canada, Marshall scored a goal.

Coaching career 
Marshall coached the Yale Bulldogs men's soccer program from 1950 until his death in 1964.

See also
List of association footballers who have been capped for two senior national teams
List of Scotland national football team captains
List of United States men's international soccer players born outside the United States

References

External links
 London Hearts profile (Scotland)
 Bethlehem Steel F.C. profile
 
  (stats merged in error with 1880s player John Marshall)

1892 births
1964 deaths
People from Baillieston
Footballers from North Ayrshire
Scottish footballers
Scotland international footballers
Scotland wartime international footballers
United States men's international soccer players
St Mirren F.C. players
Middlesbrough F.C. players
Llanelli Town A.F.C. players
American Soccer League (1921–1933) players
Brooklyn Wanderers players
Newark Skeeters players
Bethlehem Steel F.C. (1907–1930) players
Eastern Professional Soccer League (1928–29) players
Philadelphia Centennials (soccer) players
Dual internationalists (football)
Saltcoats Victoria F.C. players
Third Lanark A.C. players
Glasgow United F.C. players
American soccer players
Association football defenders
Scottish expatriate sportspeople in the United States
Expatriate soccer players in the United States
Scottish expatriate footballers
Scottish Junior Football Association players
Scottish Football League players
English Football League players
Yale Bulldogs men's soccer coaches